W Corvi is an eclipsing binary star system in the constellation Corvus, ranging from apparent magnitude 11.16 to 12.5 over 9 hours. Its period has increased by 1/4 second over a century. It is an unusual system in that its two stars are very close to each other yet have different surface temperatures and hence thermal transfer is not taking place as expected.

References

Corvus (constellation)
Beta Lyrae variables
Corvi, W